The Kamloops trout (Oncorhynchus mykiss kamloops) is a local variety of the rainbow trout, a fish in the family Salmonidae. From its native range in British Columbia, Canada, it has been transferred to several other drainages in the United States. It is often considered a part of the broader Columbia River redband trout subspecies, Oncorhynchus mykiss gairdneri.

References

Oncorhynchus
Trout, Kamloops
Trout, Kamloops
Trout, Kamloops
Trout, Kamloops
Natural history of British Columbia